Luke George-Blakely (born 13 July 1988) is an English-born Antiguan international footballer who played for Antigua Barracuda FC in the USL Professional Division. Blakely started his youth career playing for Highfield Rangers in his hometown of Leicester, England. In 2007, he relocated to the U.S to play college soccer for Marshalltown Community College in the NJCAA.

Career

College and amateur
Blakely played the 2007 season with Marshalltown Community College where he helped MCC win the Iowa Conference and finish 3rd in the NJCAA national tournament. Blakely was awarded an honorable mention in the 2007 Iowa Regional team. Blakely transferred to Illinois Institute of Technology of the NAIA for the 2008 season where he helped IIT win two CCAC Conference Championships in 2008 and 2010. While captaining the side for his junior and senior year, Blakely was CCAC All-Conference honorable mention in 2008 and CCAC first team all-Conference in 2010.

During his college years Blakely also played for the Chicago Fire Premier in the National Premier Soccer League and Chicago Fire Premier U23 in the United States Adult Soccer Association. In 2010 Blakely helped the Chicago Fire Premier U23 to a national championship.

Professional
Blakely signed with USL Professional Division club Antigua Barracuda FC in March 2012. He made his professional debut on 6, April 2012 in the Barracudas season opening game against the Pittsburgh Riverhounds.

International career
Blakely received his first call up to the Antigua and Barbuda national football team in March 2012 and was included in the squad for a friendly against St Kitts. Blakely received his first cap on 12, March 2012 when he started in the 1–0 defeat against St Kitts. On 30, March 2012 Blakely received his second cap when he started for Antigua against St Vincent. Blakely was starting defensive midfielder in the Antigua and Barbuda World Cup Qualifiers squad that is competed in a group with USA, Jamaica and Guatemala.

External links
 Marshalltown Stats
 
 
 

1988 births
Living people
English footballers
Antigua and Barbuda footballers
Antigua and Barbuda international footballers
Antigua Barracuda F.C. players
Barwell F.C. players
Stamford A.F.C. players
Loughborough Dynamo F.C. players
USL Championship players
English sportspeople of Antigua and Barbuda descent
People from Leicester
Association football midfielders
Association football defenders